Branham is a surname. Notable people with the surname include:

 Sara Branham Matthews, American microbiologist and physician
 Adelia Pope Branham (1861-1917), American writer
 Lucy Gwynne Branham, American suffragist
 Malaki Branham (born 2003), American basketball player
 William M. Branham, American Christian minister and faith healer
 George Branham III, American professional ten-pin bowler